Man's Law and God's is a 1922 American silent drama film directed by Finis Fox and starring Jack Livingston, Ethel Shannon and Rose Melville.

Cast
 Jack Livingston as Bruce MacDonald
 Ethel Shannon as 	Kitty Roshay
 Kate Anderson as 	Bruce's Mother
 Bobbie Mack as Uncle Jimmie 
 Joy Winthrop as Aunt Jenny
 George Cummings as 	Cameo Brooks
 Rose Melville as 	Helen DuBrose

References

Bibliography
 Connelly, Robert B. The Silents: Silent Feature Films, 1910-36, Volume 40, Issue 2. December Press, 1998.
 Munden, Kenneth White. The American Film Institute Catalog of Motion Pictures Produced in the United States, Part 1. University of California Press, 1997.

External links
 

1922 films
1922 drama films
1920s English-language films
American silent feature films
Silent American drama films
American black-and-white films
Films directed by Finis Fox
1920s American films